John Martin Robinson FSA (born 1948) is a British architectural historian and officer of arms.

He was born in Preston, Lancashire, and educated at Fort Augustus Abbey, a Benedictine school in Scotland, the University of St Andrews (graduating MA and awarded D.LITT in 2002) and then in 1970 arrived at Oriel College, Oxford, to prepare for a DPhil. The doctoral degree was awarded in 1974 for work on the architect Samuel Wyatt. He worked for the Greater London Council Historic Buildings Division from 1974 to 1986, where he worked inter alia as architectural editor of the Survey of London, and Historic Buildings Inspector for Westminster, and also revised the Statutory Lists of Historic Buildings for 2 east London boroughs. As an independent consultant since 1988 he has advised on the restoration of numerous country houses, churches and other listed buildings. His contribution to the Conservation Plan for 7 Dials and Covent Garden in London won the 1998 Camden Environmental Award. He also wrote the Conservation Plan for the Ashmolean Museum, Oxford, in association with Rick Mather Architects.

He has been an Architectural Writer for Country Life for over 40 years contributing nearly 400 articles and reviews.
As chairman of the Art and Architecture Committee of Westminster Cathedral he has overseen the completion of the mosaics in St George's and St Joseph's chapels, the Vaughan Chantrey and several individual panels.

Robinson was Fitzalan Pursuivant Extraordinary at the College of Arms from 1982 and is now Maltravers Herald Extraordinary. In 1978 he was appointed Librarian to the Duke of Norfolk Earl Marshal.

Robinson is also a Knight of Magistral Grace of the Sovereign Military Order of Malta. He lives at Beckside House, Cumbria, and is an active member of the Georgian Group of which he was a trustee and vice-chairman for 20 years, acquiring their HQ Adam townhouse in Fitzroy Square, setting up the Casework committee, and instituting the Young Georgians, and founding and presiding over the Annual conservation Awards for 10 years from 2003 to 2013.

He served on the North West Regional Committee of the National Trust for 10 Years and is Heraldic Adviser to the National Trust. He was a trustee of the Lakeland Arts Trust for 25 years, and served on the Council of the Society of Antiquaries, the council of the National Records Association, and is a trustee of Arundel Castle, Burghley House and Wilton House. He was a founder member of the Friends of Christ Church Spitalfields and helped establish the music Festival there. His scholarly book on James Wyatt is the definitive treatment of the subject. His New Georgian Handbook, written jointly with Alexandra Artley of Harpers Magazine, was the architectural face of the Young Fogey movement and has become collectable.

Bibliography 
 The Observations of Humphrey Repton (Phaidon 1978)
 The Wyatts: An Architectural Dynasty (1979) Foreword by Woodrow Wyatt, Oxford University Press, 
 Georgian Model Farms: A Study of Decorative and Model Farm Buildings in the Age of Improvement, 1700–1846 (1982) Oxford University Press .
 Royal Residences (Macdonald 1982)
 The Dukes of Norfolk (1983 & 1995) .
 The Latest Country Houses: 1945–83 (1984) The Bodley Head Ltd, .
 The New Georgian Handbook. JMR & Alexandra Artley (Harpers 1985)
 Arundel's Remembrances (1987).
 Cardinal Consalvi 1757–1824 (1987) The Bodley Head.
 The Oxford Guide to Heraldry (1988) John Martin Robinson & Thomas Woodcock, Oxford University Press, .
 The Country House at War (1989) The Bodley Head Ltd, .
 The English Country Estate (Century Hutchinson/ National Trust 1988)
 Chatto Curiosities - Heraldry (Chatto & Windus 1989)
 Temples of Delight: Stowe Landscape Gardens (1990) , .
 A Guide to the Country Houses of the North West (1991) Constable, .
 Arundel Castle (1994).
 Treasures of English Churches (Sinclair Stevenson 1995)
 Uppark Restored. JMR & Christopher Rowell (National Trust 1996)
 The National Trust Guide to Heraldry. JMR & Thomas Woodcock (National Trust 1999)
 Francis Johnson Architect (2001) J. M. Robinson & David Neave, Oblong Creative, .
 The Staffords (Phillimore 2002)
 Buckingham Palace. The Official Illustrated History (2004)
 Windsor Castle. The Official Illustrated History (2004)
 The Regency Country House (2005)
 The Regency Country House (2005) Aurum Press, .
 Grass Seed in June – The Making of an Architectural Historian (autobiography) (2006) Michael Russell (Publishing) Ltd, .
 Arundel Castle (2011).
 Felling the Ancient Oaks: How England Lost its Great Country Estates (2011) Aurum Press Ltd, .
 James Wyatt. Architect to George III (Yale 2013)
 Requisitioned: The British Country House in the Second World War (2014) Aurum Press 
 The Travellers Club: A Bicentennial History (2018)
Magazine articles
 "A. D. Profile 22: Hawksmoor's Christ Church, Spitalfields" - contributor - Architectural Design, 7/1979 C. Amery, R. W. Chitham, K. Downes, M. Gillingham, J. Kenworthy-Browne, R. A. Beddard, J. M. Robinson, G. Stamp. pp. 1–32.
 "Cameron discoveries" in: Architectural Review, 1982, 1030. J. M. Robinson, D. Shvidkovsky. pp. 42–51 – includes bibliographical references.
 "The Signior" in: AA-Files, 1985, 8 J. M. Robinson. pp. 108–109 – book review.
 "In pursuit of excellence" in: Country Life, 1979, 4277 J. M. Robinson. pp. 2113–2114.
 "Classical quartet: new country houses" in: Country Life, 35/1990 J. M. Robinson. pp. 74–77.
 "No. 20 St James's Square, London" in: Country Life, 44/1989 J. M. Robinson pp. 152–157.
 "Pavilions to pleasure" in: Country Life, 14/1989 K. Powell, J. Glancey, J. M. Robinson. pp. 132–133.
 "Scraping the ceiling" in: Country Life, 16/1989 J. M. Robinson. pp. 192–193.

Arms

References

External links 
 Full text of doctoral thesis, "Samuel Wyatt, architect" via Oxford Research Archive

1948 births
Alumni of Oriel College, Oxford
English architectural historians
English officers of arms
Living people
Fellows of the Society of Antiquaries of London
English Roman Catholics
Knights of Malta
Writers from Preston, Lancashire
English architecture writers
Country Life (magazine) people